Garfield: A Tail of Two Kitties, known as Garfield 2 in Europe, is a pair of video games, one for the Nintendo DS, and the other for PlayStation 2 and Microsoft Windows, all released on October 17, 2006. They are based on the movie Garfield: A Tail of Two Kitties.

Gameplay
Garfield is a playable character in all versions; the PlayStation 2 and Windows versions, which feature 3D platforming, allow players to switch to playing as Christophe and Claudius. The gameplay loosely follows the plot of the movie. The game starts with a quick tutorial.

In the Nintendo DS version, which is a 2.5D side scroller, Garfield must travel all through England to get to the castle in time for dinner. Along the way, Garfield may collect various food items, such as hero sandwiches, burgers, and soft drinks. These are not important to the game, but add interest. The game consists of 22 levels (and a bonus introductory level), and there is a time attack mode for some levels.

Story
The story is very similar to the plot of Garfield: A Tail of Two Kitties, with few differences. The game starts in the garden. Garfield must defeat Dargis by completing missions in four areas of the castle. In the Nintendo DS version, Prince invites Garfield to a lasagna dinner at his castle.

Reception

Garfield: A Tail of Two Kitties received moderate reviews. GameRankings gave it a score of 71.50% for the PC version, and 63.35% for the DS version, with Metacritic giving this handheld version a 59 out of 100.

Reviews of the DS version were largely unimpressed. Lucas Thomas writing for IGN called it a "by-the-numbers platformer with little to tie it in with its source material". While he consider that there was "a few impressive visual moments" to be found in the game, he concluded the experience was overall uninspiring. GameZone likewise called the gameplay "as much repetitive as it is boring" dismissing the experience as uninteresting and unoriginal.

The PC/PS2 version was viewed more favourably, with PC Gamer calling it "a surprisingly good movie-to-game" and complemented its "outstanding graphics". GameZone referred to the PC version as cute and commented that the game was engaging, but was critical of the controls and inconsistent difficulty.

References

External links

 

Video games based on Garfield
Video games based on adaptations
Video games set in castles
2006 video games
20th Century Studios video games
Nintendo DS games
Nintendo DS-only games
PlayStation 2 games
Video games developed in France
Video games developed in the Netherlands
Windows games
Garfield (film series)
Asobo Studio games
The Game Factory games
3D platform games
Video games with 2.5D graphics